Alex Weir (5 March 1921 – 4 July 2006) was an Australian cricketer. He played in one first-class match for South Australia in 1949/50.

See also
 List of South Australian representative cricketers

References

External links
 

1921 births
2006 deaths
Australian cricketers
South Australia cricketers
Cricketers from Adelaide